Norman Brown Jr.
(16 March 1959 – 31 July 1983) 
was from Newry in Northern Ireland. 
He was an Irish professional motorcycle road racer.

Biography

Brown was born in Newry, County Down, Northern Ireland, where his father, Norman Brown Sr., ran a public house, "The Star Bar" or "Brown's Bar", overlooking the Clanrye River and Newry Town Hall. An alumnus of Newry High School, Brown Jr. won the 1982 "Classic race" in the Isle of Man TT. In 1983, he raised the TT lap record to 116.19 mph in the Senior Classic event for machines up to 1000cc. Brown also won the 350cc class at the 1983 North West 200 race in Northern Ireland.

Death
Brown was killed during the 1983 British Grand Prix at Silverstone on 31 July 1983. When it began to rain he slowed, apparently due to mechanical problems. With greatly reduced speed he continued the lap to reach the pits. After exiting the Stowe he held to the inside line and was passed by multiple riders before being hit by Swiss rider Peter Huber, whose view was obscured by the riders in front of him. The race was not stopped until multiple riders decided to enter the pits voluntarily. Both riders died as a consequence of their serious injuries.

References

1960 births
1983 deaths
Sportspeople from Newry
Isle of Man TT riders
British motorcycle racers
Motorcycle racers from Northern Ireland
Motorcycle racers who died while racing
Filmed deaths in motorsport
Sport deaths in England
Date of birth missing